United Democrats is a political party in Denmark.

History
United Democrats was founded in 2013, and ran for municipal council that year in Assens, Frederikshavn, Kalundborg, Morsø, Thisted, Helsingør and Copenhagen Municipality. They did not win any seats in any of those municipalities.

Election results

Municipal elections

References

Political parties in Denmark
Political parties established in 2013
2013 establishments in Denmark